Mark Smith (born 30 September 1969) is a British actor and body builder who starred as Rhino on the popular ITV show, Gladiators. He now lives in Los Angeles.

Early life
Smith was born in Acton, London on 30 September 1969 to Jamaican parents.

Career
Smith starred as 'Leo' in the Nickelodeon (UK & Ireland) show Renford Rejects and also guest starred as 'Johnson' in the hit BBC soap EastEnders. He has also appeared In Trial & Retribution for Lynda LaPlante, Robin Hood as the role of Karim. Then Mark moved with his family to LA and has built his resume with projects including Pirates of the Caribbean: On Stranger Tides, Hitchhikers Guide to the Galaxy, Rollin' with the Nines and an appearance as 'Shadow Warrior' in the film Batman Begins.

On 4 June 2005, at London's infamous York Hall, Smith went head to head with lottery winner Michael Carroll in a boxing match. The fight drew much publicity with the press conference ending in a brawl after Carroll lunged for Smith. On the day, the fight had to be stopped three times due to Carroll's inability to continue. The former binman later stated "I will definitely get back in the ring with him. I will train harder next time." The charity re-match took place at the Manchester Evening News Arena in September 2005. This time Carroll was knocked out in the 2nd Round.

After Gladiators he became an actor and producer in Los Angeles.

Filmography

Film

Television

Video games

References

External links
Mark Smith's Official Web Site (archive)

1969 births
British bodybuilders
English male film actors
English male television actors
English male voice actors
English expatriates in the United States
English emigrants to the United States
Living people
People from Ealing
Gladiators (1992 British TV series)
English people of Jamaican descent
Black British sportsmen